Yogeshwar (Hindi: योगेश्‍वर) is a mountain of the Garhwal Himalaya in Uttarakhand, India. It is joint 52nd highest located entirely within the Uttarakhand. Nanda Devi, is the highest mountain in this category. Yogeshwar lies on the ridge between Chaturbhuj  and Sri Kailash . Its nearest higher neighbor unnamed peak  lies 2.7 km N. It is located 2.7 km east of Chaturbhuj  and 5 km NW lies Matri .

Climbing history

A four-man British team comprising Simon Yearsley, Steve Adderley, Malcolm Bass and Julian Clamp used the Swetvarn Glacier for their approach to Yogeshwar. On October 2, except Steve Adderley other three made the second ascent of Yogeshwar (6678 meters, 21,910 feet) by a new dangerous south face route. They thought they are  making the first ascent, without knowing that in June, 1991 an Indian team led by Ramakant Mahadik had climbed Yogeshwar by the southeast ridge. They established their Base Camp and Advance Base camp at 4800 and 5500 meters. Steve and Julian made an attempt on the west ridge on 24 September. They gained this via the north col between Yogeshwar and Chaturbhuj (6655 m), but came back from 6200 m in the face of unstable snow condition on the ridge.

Glaciers and rivers
There are four glaciers around Yogeshwar two on the northern side and two on the southern side. On the southern side Swetvarn Glacier on the south west side and Shyamvarn Glacier on the south east side both these glacier joins Raktvarn Glacier which itself ultimately drains near Gangotri glacier from where emerges Bhagirathi river the main tributaries of river Ganga. On the Northern side, Gulligad Glacier on the north west side and Lambigad Glacier on the north east side both this glacier drains down to Jadh Ganga which also met Bhagirathi river near Bharionghati. Bhagirathi joins the Alaknanda River the other main tributaries of river Ganga at Dev Prayag and called Ganga there after.

Neighboring peaks

Neighboring peaks of Yogeshwar :

 Chaturbhuj  
 Matri 
 Sudarshan Parbat 
 Kalidhang 
 Sri Kailash:

See also

 List of Himalayan peaks of Uttarakhand

References

Mountains of Uttarakhand
Six-thousanders of the Himalayas
Geography of Chamoli district